Protein-synthesizing GTPases (elongation factor (EF), initiation factor (IF), peptide-release or termination factor) are enzymes involved in mRNA translation into protein by the ribosome, with systematic name GTP phosphohydrolase (mRNA-translation-assisting). They usually include translation initiation factors such as IF-2 and translation elongation factors such as EF-Tu.

References

External links 
 

EC 3.6.5